Tickfaw State Park, located  west of Springfield, in Livingston Parish, Louisiana, opened in May 1999 and quickly became one of Louisiana's most popular state parks because of its natural setting, recreation opportunities, and proximity to the state's two cities: New Orleans and Baton Rouge. The park contains a nature center, picnic shelters, a large fishing pond, 14 cabins, and 50 campsites.

Much of Tickfaw's  area lies within the Tickfaw River floodplain and is thus subject to periodic flooding. About  of the park west of the Tickfaw River remain undeveloped.

Tickfaw State Park is recognized as one of 110 sites on the Louisiana Natural Areas Registry for its outstanding natural characteristics. Its rich natural habitat provides a home for various birds, fish, reptiles and mammals including American alligators, nine-banded armadillos, North American beavers, white-tailed deer, foxes, Virginia opossums, rabbits, raccoons, and squirrels. Carolina anoles and skinks are frequently seen along the boardwalks.

Canoeing is a popular pastime at Tickfaw State Park. Canoes are available for rent, or paddlers may bring their own. During warm months, an on-premises water playground allows guests to cool off.

See also
List of Louisiana state parks

References

External links

Tickfaw State Park, including a map 
Tickfaw State Park Camping, Canoeing, Hiking 

Protected areas of Livingston Parish, Louisiana
State parks of Louisiana
Protected areas established in 1990
1990 establishments in Louisiana